Siu Hei may refer to:
 Siu Hei Court, a public housing estate in Tuen Mun, Hong Kong
 Siu Hei stop, an MTR Light Rail stop adjacent to the estate